Joanne Pricilla Loutoy (born 31 December 1992) is a Seychellois sprinter. She competed in the 60 metres event at the 2014 IAAF World Indoor Championships.

References

External links
 
 

1992 births
Living people
Seychellois female sprinters
People from Greater Victoria, Seychelles
World Athletics Championships athletes for Seychelles
Commonwealth Games competitors for Seychelles
Athletes (track and field) at the 2014 Commonwealth Games
Athletes (track and field) at the 2018 Commonwealth Games